Andrey Karasyow (born 26 May 1991) is a Belarusian former professional footballer who plays for Brestzhilstroy.

External links

1991 births
Living people
Association football midfielders
Belarusian footballers
FC Dynamo Brest players
FC Volna Pinsk players
FC Kobrin players
Sportspeople from Brest, Belarus